Gale Sondergaard (born Edith Holm Sondergaard; February 15, 1899 – August 14, 1985) was an American actress.

Sondergaard began her acting career in theater and progressed to films in 1936. She was the first recipient of the Academy Award for Best Supporting Actress for her film debut in Anthony Adverse (1936). She regularly had supporting roles in films during the late 1930s and 1940s, including The Cat and the Canary (1939), The Mark of Zorro (1940) and The Letter (1940). For her role in Anna and the King of Siam (1946), she was nominated for her second Best Supporting Actress Academy Award. After the late 1940s, her screen work came to an abrupt end for the next 20 years.

Married to director Herbert Biberman, Sondergaard supported him when he was accused of communism and named as one of the Hollywood Ten in the early 1950s. She moved with Biberman to New York City and worked in theatre, and acted in film and television occasionally from the late 1960s. She moved back to Los Angeles, where she died from cerebrovascular thrombosis.

Early life
Sondergaard was born in Litchfield, Minnesota, to Danish immigrants, Hans Sondergaard (born Hans Tjellesen Schmidt Søndergaard) and Anna Kirstine Søndergaard (née Holm). Her father taught at the University of Minnesota, where she was a drama student.

Stage and film career

Until the late 1940s
Sondergaard studied acting at the Minneapolis School of Dramatic Arts before joining the John Keller Shakespeare Company. She later toured North America in productions of Hamlet, Julius Caesar, The Merchant of Venice and Macbeth. After joining the Theatre Guild, she began performing on the New York stage.

She made her first film appearance in Anthony Adverse (1936) as Faith Paleologus, for which she received the Academy Award for Best Supporting Actress. Her career flourished during the 1930s, including a role with Paul Muni in The Life of Emile Zola (1937).

During pre-production of Metro-Goldwyn-Mayer's classic The Wizard of Oz (1939), an early idea was to have the Wicked Witch of the West portrayed as a slinky, glamorous villainess in a black, sequined costume, inspired by the Evil Queen in Walt Disney's Snow White and the Seven Dwarfs (1937). Sondergaard was cast as the witch and photographed for two wardrobe tests, both of which survive—one as a glamorous witch, and another as a conventionally ugly one. After the decision was made to have an ugly witch, Sondergaard, reluctant to wear the disfiguring makeup and fearing it could damage her career, withdrew from the role, and it went to veteran character actress Margaret Hamilton. 

Sondergaard was cast as the sultry and slinky Tylette, a magically humanized but devious cat, in The Blue Bird (1940), and played the exotic, sinister Eurasian wife in The Letter (1940) starring Bette Davis. She had a supporting role in The Spider Woman (aka Sherlock Holmes and the Spider Woman, 1943), part of the Universal cycle, followed by the non-canonical The Spider Woman Strikes Back (1946), also for Universal.

She received a second Academy Award nomination as Best Supporting Actress for her role as the king's principal wife in Anna and the King of Siam (1946).

House Un-American Activities Committee
Sondergaard's career suffered irreparable damage during the United States Congressional HUAC Red Scare of the early 1950s when her husband was accused of being a communist and named as one of the Hollywood Ten. With her career stalled, she supported her husband during the production of Salt of the Earth (1954). They sold their home in Hollywood shortly after they completed Salt of the Earth and moved to New York where Sondergaard was able to work in theatre.

Later career
In 1969, she appeared in an off-Broadway one-woman show, Woman. She resumed her career in film and television around the same time. Her revived career extended into the early 1980s.

Personal life
Her younger sister Hester Sondergaard was also an actress who featured in Seeds of Freedom (1943), The Naked City (1948), Jigsaw (1949) and The Big Break (1953).

Sondergaard married actor Neill O'Malley in 1922; they divorced in 1930. On May 15, 1930, in Philadelphia, Pennsylvania, she married director Herbert Biberman, who was then associated with the Theatre Guild Acting Company. He became a film director and died in 1971. They adopted two children, Joan Kirstine Biberman (married name Campos, 1940) and Daniel Hans Biberman.

Following several strokes, Sondergaard died from cerebral vascular thrombosis in the Motion Picture and Television Hospital in Woodland Hills, California in 1985, aged 86. She had been admitted to the hospital in 1982.

Acting credits

Stage

Film and television

See also

References

Further reading

External links

 
 
 
 
 

1899 births
1985 deaths
20th-century American actresses
Actresses from Minnesota
American film actresses
American stage actresses
American television actresses
American people of Danish descent
Best Supporting Actress Academy Award winners
Deaths from cerebral thrombosis
Hollywood blacklist
People from Litchfield, Minnesota